"Gordon Bennett" is an English-language idiomatic phrase used to express surprise, contempt, outrage, disgust, or frustration.

Background
The expression is thought to derive from the controversial reputation of James Gordon Bennett Jr. (1841–1918), son of Scottish-born James Gordon Bennett Sr. founder and  publisher of the New York Herald. Bennett Jr. was an accomplished polo player, tennis player and yachtsman.

Usage
The phrase is often said by Del Boy Trotter, played by David Jason, in the British sitcom Only Fools And Horses.

References

English phrases
English-language idioms